Synoecism can mean:
 Synoecism, Syniokismos, Sunoikismos, Synoecismus, the incorporation or conurbation of smaller settlements into a city (urbs, polis) or municipality (municipium)
 Synoecism, the botanical condition of being synoecious, a synonym of monoecious

See also
 Dioecism (disambiguation)